Steve or Stephen Owens may refer to:
Steve Owens (Canadian politician) (1956–2016), member of the Legislative Assembly of Ontario
Steve Owens (American football) (born 1947), 1969 Heisman Trophy winner
Steve Owens (Arizona politician) (born 1955), former congressional candidate and chair of the Arizona Democratic Party
Steve Owens (baseball) (born 1965), American college baseball coach
Steve Owens (Missouri) (born 1956), interim president of the University of Missouri system
Stephen T. Owens (born 1948), American lawyer
Stephen Owens (Kansas politician), member of the Kansas House of Representatives
Steven Owens, member of the Massachusetts House of Representatives

See also
Steve Owen (disambiguation)